Ebony Marinoff (born 15 November 1997) is an Australian rules footballer playing for the Adelaide Football Club in the AFL Women's (AFLW). Marinoff is a three-time AFL Women's premiership player and five-time AFL Women's All-Australian, and won the Adelaide Club Champion award in 2021. Marinoff is the AFL Women's games record holder and Adelaide games record holder with 66 games.

Early life
Marinoff's first introduction to the sport was through the Auskick program. She first played competitive football at the age of five in the boys team at Lockleys Football Club in the Adelaide suburb of Lockleys. She remained at the club through to the age of twelve. She later moved on to play with an all-girls team at Morphetville Park. In 2014, at sixteen years of age, she played in her first premiership with the senior side at Morphettville Park, and played in two more premierships in 2015 and 2016. Marinoff represented South Australia in under-16, under-18 and open age teams. In 2015, she was named in the youth girls All-Australian team.

Marinoff played for South Australia in the 2016 women's exhibition series. She was named best-on-ground for a 37-disposal performance in a South Australia intra-club match at Adelaide Oval in April and kicked the match-winning goal in the late stages of the final quarter against NSW/ACT at Adelaide Oval in June.

AFL Women's career

2017
Marinoff made her debut in the club's inaugural match in round 1, 2017 against  at Thebarton Oval, where she gathered a game-high twenty disposals and six tackles in the 36-point win. Her performance earned her a nomination for the 2017 AFL Women's Rising Star award. Marinoff was a member of the Adelaide team that won the inaugural AFL Women's premiership in 2017, defeating  by six points at Metricon Stadium. A few days later, Marinoff was named in the 2017 AFL Women's All-Australian team and announced as the 2017 AFL Women's Rising Star. She also led the competition in tackles (76) and average tackles per game (9.5) in its inaugural season. Adelaide signed Marinoff for the 2018 season during the trade period in May 2017. She later played for The Allies in the inaugural AFL Women's State of Origin match on 2 September, where she was named among the Allies' best players with 13 disposals and five tackles.

2018

After an impressive start to the 2018 season, in round 4, Marinoff set a new record for tackles with 21 in her side's draw against Greater Western Sydney in heavy rain at Blacktown ISP Oval, breaking the record of 16 set by  midfielder Sarah Hosking two weeks earlier. The effort also bested the existing men's league record of 19, thus setting the national senior-level record across men's and women's competitions for tackles. Marinoff was selected in afl.com.aus Team of the Week in rounds 3, 4, 5 and 7, and finished equal-fifth in the 2018 AFL Women's best and fairest count with six votes. She was also named in the initial 2018 AFL Women's All-Australian 40-woman squad. Marinoff again finished the season leading the competition in tackles (82) and average tackles per game (11.7); both statistics were better than her previous season and in less games (Marinoff played eight of eight possible games in 2017 and seven of seven possible games in 2018).

2019
In round 3 of the 2019 season, Marinoff broke the league disposal record of 30 set by Emma Kearney in round 6 of the 2017 season, recording 33 disposals in Adelaide's win against  at Norwood Oval (a record which was later broken by teammate Anne Hatchard in 2020), and was selected in womens.afls Team of the Week in rounds 1, 3 and 6. Marinoff went on to play in Adelaide's second premiership, when they defeated Carlton by 45 points in front of a record AFL Women's crowd at Adelaide Oval, and was named among their best players. She was also named in the 2019 AFL Women's All-Australian team, her second All-Australian selection, and finished equal-fourth in the 2019 AFL Women's best and fairest count with seven votes. Marinoff finished the season leading the competition in kicks (130), disposals (205) and average disposals per game (22.8), along with finishing second in handballs (75), average handballs per game (8.3), tackles (74) and average tackles per game (8.2), in a career-best season. She also kicked her first AFL Women's goal in round 7 and followed up with two in the preliminary final, and finished the season as one of only three players (along with teammates Deni Varnhagen and Stevie-Lee Thompson) to have played the most AFL Women's matches to that point with 24. Adelaide signed Marinoff for the 2020 season during the trade and signing period in April 2019.

2020
Leading into the 2020 season, womens.afl journalist Sarah Black named Marinoff at no. 15 on her list of the top 30 players in the AFLW. She was selected in womens.afls Team of the Week in rounds 2 and 3. Marinoff finished the home-and-away season equal with 's Ashleigh Riddell in first for kicks (94) and average kicks per game (15.7), also improving her career-best average in disposals per game (23.2), and was one of fourteen players to have played the most AFL Women's matches to that point with 30. She was selected in the initial 40-woman squad for the 2020 AFL Women's All-Australian team, and was also selected in the AFL Players Association's inaugural AFL Women's 22under22 team, having earlier been selected in the retrospective 2017–2019 team.

2021
During a practice match in the 2021 pre-season, Marinoff made front-on contact with Greater Western Sydney player Bríd Stack in an incident that saw Stack suffer a fractured vertebra and was given a three-match suspension, the longest suspension in the competition's history to that point. Commentators such as Kane Cornes and his father, inaugural Crows AFL coach Graham Cornes, suggested that the incident was unavoidable and the club should appeal the decision. Adelaide eventually announced that it would appeal the decision, with the club calling it "grossly disproportionate" and coach Matthew Clarke calling the incident an "unavoidable footy collision". After the appeal was initially delayed due to new video evidence found by Marinoff herself, her suspension was successfully overturned by the appeals board after a hearing that lasted more than three hours, allowing Marinoff to play in the opening round of the season.  captain Daisy Pearce voluntarily provided a character reference. After leading the competition in total and average kicks during the 2021 season, Marinoff was named in the 2021 AFL Women's All-Australian team and won her first Adelaide Club Champion award. Marinoff was also selected in Champion Data's 2021 AFLW All-Star stats team, after placing in the top ten for every midfield statistical category.

2022
Marinoff was named at no. 6 in Sarah Black's 2022 list of the top 30 players in the AFLW, which was Marinoff's first appearance in the top ten. Marinoff was named among Adelaide's best players with 26 disposals in its win over Melbourne in round 4 and was selected in womens.afls Team of the Week for that round. She was best afield in Adelaide's win over Carlton in round 5 with 31 disposals, eight marks and ten tackles; she polled the maximum ten coaches' votes and was selected in womens.afls Team of the Week for that round. She was best afield with 24 disposals, 16 tackles and a goal in Adelaide's win over Greater Western Sydney in round 7; during the match, she became the first player in AFLW history to record 1,000 career disposals. Marinoff also received seven coaches' votes and was selected in womens.afls Team of the Week for round 7. She was best afield in Adelaide's win over Collingwood in round 9, which was her 50th AFLW match; she also won eight coaches' votes and was selected in womens.afls Team of the Week for that round. Marinoff was among Adelaide's best players in its win over St Kilda in round 10; she polled eight coaches' votes to finish fourth in that year's AFLW champion player of the year award, and was selected in womens.afls Team of the Week for round 10. She was named in Champion Data's 2022 AFLW All-Star stats team after leading the competition for metres gained with 395.7 a game.

Statistics
Updated to the end of S7 (2022).

|-
| bgcolor=F0E68C | 2017# ||  || 10
| 8 || 0 || 2 || 96 || 31 || 127 || 19 || bgcolor=CAE1FF | 76† || 0.0 || 0.3 || 12.0 || 3.9 || 15.9 || 2.4 || bgcolor=CAE1FF | 9.5† || 2
|-
| 2018 ||  || 10
| 7 || 0 || 2 || 81 || 28 || 109 || 14 || bgcolor=CAE1FF | 82† || 0.0 || 0.3 || 11.6 || 4.0 || 15.6 || 2.0 || bgcolor=CAE1FF | 11.7† || 6
|-
| bgcolor=F0E68C | 2019# ||  || 10
| 9 || 3 || 2 || bgcolor=CAE1FF | 130† || 75 || bgcolor=CAE1FF | 205† || 15 || 75 || 0.3 || 0.2 || 14.4 || 8.3 || bgcolor=CAE1FF | 22.8† || 1.7 || 8.3 || 7
|-
| 2020 ||  || 10
| 6 || 0 || 0 || 94 || 45 || 139 || 31 || 47 || 0.0 || 0.0 || 15.7 || 7.5 || 23.2 || 5.2 || 7.8 || 2
|-
| 2021 ||  || 10
| 11 || 1 || 2 || bgcolor=CAE1FF | 189† || 69 || 258 || 20 || 74 || 0.1 || 0.2 || bgcolor=CAE1FF | 17.2† || 6.3 || 23.5 || 1.8 || 6.7 || 11
|-
| bgcolor=F0E68C | 2022# ||  || 10
| 12 || 1 || 1 || bgcolor=CAE1FF | 195† || 96 || 291 || 48 || 87 || 0.1 || 0.1 || 16.3 || 8.0 || 24.3 || 4.0 || 7.3 || 18
|-
| S7 (2022) ||  || 10
| 13 || 2 || 1 || bgcolor=CAE1FF | 214† || 98 || bgcolor=CAE1FF | 312† || 26 || 126 || 0.2 || 0.1 || bgcolor=CAE1FF | 16.5† || 7.5 || 24.0 || 2.0 || 9.7 || 18
|- class=sortbottom
! colspan=3 | Career
! 66 !! 7 !! 10 !! 1000 !! 442 !! 1442 !! 173 !! 567 !! 0.1 !! 0.2 !! 15.2 !! 6.7 !! 21.8 !! 2.6 !! 8.6 !! 64
|}

Honours and achievements
Team
 3× AFL Women's premiership player: 2017, 2019, 2022
 2× AFL Women's minor premiership: 2021, 2022

Individual
 AFL Women's games record holder
 Adelaide equal games record holder
 5× AFL Women's All-Australian team: 2017, 2019, 2021, 2022, S7
 Adelaide Club Champion: 2021
 AFL Women's Rising Star: 2017
 Allies representative honours in AFL Women's State of Origin: 2017
 AFL Women's 22under22 team: 2020
 AFL Women's 2017–2019 22under22 team

References

External links

 
 
 

Living people
1997 births
Adelaide Football Club (AFLW) players
Australian rules footballers from South Australia
All-Australians (AFL Women's)
Darebin Falcons players